Raymond Joseph Cannon (August 26, 1894 – November 25, 1951) was an attorney, baseball player and Democratic politician who represented Wisconsin's 4th congressional district in the Congress from 1933 to 1939.

Early life
Born in Ironwood, Michigan, Cannon lost both of his parents when he was six months old and he went to an orphanage shortly then he was raised by his family members.

He played baseball semi-professionally from 1908 to 1922, primarily as a pitcher. He pitched against the Philadelphia Phillies in a spring training exhibition game in March 1918 and gave up 13 runs on 17 hits in 9-innings. He also taught school in Minocqua, Wisconsin in 1910 and 1911.

He attended Marquette University Law School in Milwaukee and was admitted to the bar in 1914. He became an early sports attorney whose clients included Jack Dempsey. After the Black Sox Scandal, he was retained by one of the blacklisted players, Happy Felsch (a Milwaukee native), who sued Charles Comiskey and the Chicago White Sox for back pay, World Series money, and damages. Felsch's teammates Buck Weaver, Shoeless Joe Jackson, and Swede Risberg also became Cannon's clients. 

In 1922, he helped put together the short-lived National Baseball Players Association of the United States, one of several unsuccessful attempts to create a union for pro ball players. It is believed that his association with the Black Sox hurt the NBPA, and may have contributed to its collapse.  In 1929 his law license was suspended, and Cannon was prevented from practicing until it was reinstated in 1931.

Politics
In 1932, Cannon was the Democratic nominee for the 4th District seat in the 73rd United States Congress, unseating Republican incumbent John C. Schafer with 61,038 votes to 33,609 for Schafer and 24,377 for Socialist State Representative Walter Polakowski.

In 1934, after Cardinal Dougherty of Philadelphia called for a Roman Catholic boycott of all films, Cannon (himself a Catholic) announced plans to introduce a congressional bill, supported by both Democrats and Republicans, which would introduce Government oversight of film censorship.

Cannon was re-elected in 1934 with a 38.56% plurality in a five-way race (against Schafer, a Socialist, a Progressive, and an independent Communist; and in 1936 (a 47.25% plurality vs. Progressive Paul Gauer and Schafer).

In 1938, Cannon was unseated in the Democratic primary by Thaddeus F. Wasielewski, but ran anyway as an independent. He lost his seat to Schafer, polling only 7,498 votes (7.02%) to Schafer's 34,196 (32.00%), Wasielewski's 33,559 (31.40%), and Progressive Gauer's 30,817 (28.84%); a Union Party candidate polled 794 votes (0.74%).

Cannon later ran unsuccessfully for the Democratic gubernatorial nomination in 1940 and 1942.

Personal life
He married Alice Carey in 1915, and they had three children: Robert, Mary Alice and Jeanne. Robert, the eldest, also became an attorney, and was elected as a Wisconsin Circuit and Wisconsin Appeals Court Judge, and served as legal advisor to the Major League Baseball Players Association.

Death
Cannon died in Milwaukee after suffering a heart attack.  He was buried at Holy Cross Cemetery & Mausoleum in Milwaukee.

References

External links

1894 births
1951 deaths
People from Ironwood, Michigan
Lawyers from Milwaukee
Marquette University Law School alumni
Semi-professional baseball players
Sports labor leaders
Democratic Party members of the United States House of Representatives from Wisconsin
20th-century American politicians
Politicians from Milwaukee
Catholics from Michigan
Catholics from Wisconsin
20th-century American lawyers